Sergei Sergeyevich Yegorov (born August 5, 1975) is a Russian professional football coach currently managing FC Zelenograd in the Russian Second Division. He also is a director for the club.

External links
 Career summary by KLISF

1975 births
Living people
Russian football managers